This is a list of Asterix films.

Films

Animation

 1967 – Asterix the Gaul (Astérix le Gaulois) with Roger Carel as Asterix and Jacques Morel as Obelix
 1968 – Asterix and Cleopatra (Astérix et Cléopâtre) with Roger Carel as Asterix and Jacques Morel as Obelix
 1976 – The Twelve Tasks of Asterix (Les Douze travaux d'Astérix) with Roger Carel as Asterix and Jacques Morel as Obelix
 1985 – Asterix Versus Caesar (Astérix et la surprise de César) with Roger Carel as Asterix and Pierre Tornade as Obelix
 1986 – Asterix in Britain (Astérix chez les Bretons) with Roger Carel as Asterix and Pierre Tornade as Obelix
 1989 – Asterix and the Big Fight (Astérix et le coup du menhir) (book of the film: Operation Getafix) with Roger Carel as Asterix and Pierre Tornade as Obelix
 1994 – Asterix Conquers America (Astérix et les Indiens — produced in Germany as Asterix in Amerika) with Roger Carel as Asterix and Pierre Tornade as Obelix
 2006 – Asterix and the Vikings (Astérix et les Vikings) with Roger Carel as Asterix and Jacques Frantz as Obelix
 2014 – Asterix: The Mansions of the Gods (Astérix: Le Domaine des Dieux) with Roger Carel as Asterix and Guillaume Briat as Obelix
 2018 – Asterix: The Secret of the Magic Potion (Astérix: Le Secret de la potion magique) with Christian Clavier as Asterix

Live–action

 1967 – Two Romans in Gaul ("Deux Romains en Gaule") - a television film combining live action and animation; black & white and one hour long. Long considered unavailable, it was released on DVD in 2012.
 1999 – Asterix and Obelix Take on Caesar (Astérix et Obélix contre César) 
 2002 – Asterix & Obelix: Mission Cleopatra (Astérix et Obélix : Mission Cléopâtre)   
 2008 – Asterix at the Olympic Games (Astérix aux Jeux Olympiques)
 2012 – Asterix and Obelix: God Save Britannia (Astérix et Obélix : Au service de sa Majesté)
 2023 – Asterix & Obelix: The Middle Kingdom (Astérix et Obélix : l'Empire du milieu)

Notes
No novelizations were made for Asterix the Gaul, Asterix in Britain or Asterix and Cleopatra which followed the original albums relatively closely.
In 1967, there was an attempt to make an animated film based on Asterix and the Golden Sickle, which wasn't completed. The incomplete script and drawings were sold in a book-exhibition in Brussels and is today a part of the book The Mirror World of Asterix. Another reason for its failure is that Goscinny and Uderzo rejected the artists from releasing this movie because of its low quality drawings.
The Twelve Tasks of Asterix is the only animated movie not based (at least loosely) on any of the comic books until the 2018 film The Secret of the Magic Potion. It may not be mentioned in the book, but is adapted from Asterix Conquers Rome.
Starting from 1985's Asterix Versus Caesar the animation quality improved dramatically.
Asterix and the Big Fight, Asterix Conquers America and Asterix and the Vikings were the only three produced solely outside France with the former two being produced in Germany and the latter in Denmark.
Early English dubbed versions of cartoon movies used character names from the Ranger/Look and Learn "Asterix the Briton" translations, such as Tunabrix for the village chieftain.
Asterix Conquers America, Asterix & the Vikings and Asterix: The Mansions of the Gods are digitally drawn and animated.
Asterix: The Mansions of the Gods is the first Asterix movie in stereoscopic 3D.
 The animated Asterix movies that were dubbed into English were all dubbed in either France or the United Kingdom, with the exception of Asterix and the Vikings, where it was then dubbed in the United States, in order to bring Asterix into the U.S. market, while The Mansion of the Gods and The Secret of the Magic Potion were dubbed in Canada. A North American Dub of Asterix and the Big Fight is used in all DVD releases, but fans generally consider it inferior to the original British dub, which is only available on VHS.
Asterix Conquers America and Asterix and The Vikings are the only animated Asterix films to be produced in English first, then dubbed into French.
Though several of the Asterix comics are available in the United States, most of the Asterix films have not seen releases in America, likely due to the comics being not as popular as in the United Kingdom. The first five films (Asterix the Gaul, Asterix and Cleopatra, The Twelve Tasks of Asterix, Asterix and Caesar and Asterix in Britain) did see VHS releases through Walt Disney Studios Home Entertainment and Just for Kids Home Video, but all five have since gone out of print.

See also
 List of films based on French-language comics

References

External links
Asterix at the IMDB

Asterix